Immingham railway station may refer to:

 Immingham Dock railway station
 Immingham Dock electric railway station
 Immingham (Eastern Jetty) railway station 
 Immingham Town electric railway station
 Immingham (Queens Road) electric railway station